This page lists the squads picked for the 2007 ICC World Twenty20. This is the first World Twenty20 tournament which had been organised by the ICC. The championship was run from 11 to 24 September 2007 in South Africa. 12 teams took part in the championship, and the teams were sorted by their groups in the preliminary group stage. The first-class team listed for each player is the domestic team he plays for in his home country and any English county he has played for in the 2007 season, which was running concurrently to the World Twenty20 tournament. The winner of the Final was India. Second place went to Pakistan.

Group A

Bangladesh
Bangladesh announced their squad on 9 August 2007.

South Africa
South Africa announced their squad on 11 August 2007. Loots Bosman was ruled out of the competition with a lower back injury.

West Indies

Group B

Australia
Australia's T20 squad was announced on 20 July 2007. Shaun Tait was named in the original squad but was later ruled out after elbow surgery; he was replaced by Ben Hilfenhaus. The squad was generally the same as that which won the ICC Cricket World Cup earlier in the year.

England
England announced their squad on 6 August 2007. Ravi Bopara pulled out from the tournament on 4 September, after dislocating his thumb during a bowling spell in the ODI series against India. Three days later, James Anderson was announced to replace him. Ryan Sidebottom also withdrew after failing to recover from a side injury sustained during the third Test against India in early August: Dimitri Mascarenhas was called up as his replacement.

Zimbabwe

Zimbabwe announced their squad on 14 August 2007. Tatenda Taibu returned to the team for the first time in two years.

Group C

Kenya

Kenya announced their squad on 14 August 2007.

New Zealand

New Zealand announced their squad on 9 August 2007. Long-time captain Stephen Fleming, who stepped down from the One-day International captaincy after the 2007 World Cup, was not included, and Daniel Vettori was given the captaincy. Scott Styris could be replaced, as he has struggled with injury problems playing for Durham in England in 2007.

Sri Lanka

Muttiah Muralitharan was originally selected in the squad, but was withdrawn on 31 August 2007 after straining a biceps. Dilruwan Perera replaced him.

Group D

India
India's squad was announced on 8 August 2007

Pakistan

After a dressing room incident on 6 September 2007, in which Shoaib Akhtar was alleged to have hit Mohammad Asif with a bat, Akhtar was handed an indefinite ban by the Pakistan Cricket Board and sent home from the tournament before it even began. Sohail Tanvir, an uncapped allrounder, replaced him. Misbah-ul-haq was a controversial selection ahead of Mohammed Yousuf. Yet Misbah ended up being the 2nd highest run scorer in the competition.

Scotland

See also
2007 ICC World Twenty20
2007 ICC World Twenty20 officials

Notes

External links
CricketArchive – 2007 ICC World Twenty20 competition page
Cricinfo – 2007 ICC World Twenty20 competition page
Cricinfo – Squad overview
T20 cricinfo-The home of T20 Cricket

Squads, 2007 Icc World Twenty20
Cricket squads
ICC Men's T20 World Cup squads